Barbara McClintock (born May 6, 1955) is an American illustrator and author of children's books.

Background 
McClintock was born in Flemington, New Jersey, on May 6, 1955, and spent her early childhood in Clinton, New Jersey. She moved to North Dakota with her mother and sister when she was nine years old.

After attending Jamestown College in Jamestown, North Dakota, she moved to New York City a week following her 20th birthday on the recommendation of Maurice Sendak, whom she called to ask advice about how to become a children's book illustrator. She studied briefly at the Art Students League of New York.

McClintock worked for Jim Henson illustrating books for his Fraggle Rock cable television series early in her career.

Her books have won numerous awards, including four New York Times Book Review Best Illustrated Books, a Boston Globe/Horn Book Honor award (2003, for Dahlia ), two Time magazine Best Books, eight New York Public Library 100 Recommended Books, a Golden Kite award, two Parents Choice, an ALA Notable Book, a NEBA, starred reviews in Publishers Weekly, SLJ, Kirkus and Horn Book. The Minneapolis Children's Theatre made a ballet/opera of her book Animal Fables From Aesop, originally published in 1991 by David R. Godine, Publisher.

References

External links
 
 Biography
  (1979–2014)
Interview with Barbara McClintock about the Children's Theatre Company adaptation of Animal Fables From Aesop, All About Kids! TV Series #180 (1994)

1955 births
American children's book illustrators
American children's writers
Artists from North Dakota
People from Clinton, New Jersey
People from Flemington, New Jersey
University of Jamestown alumni
Living people
American women children's writers
21st-century American women writers
21st-century American women artists